This is a list of Māori plant common names.

 Akakura
 Akatea
 Akeake
 Aruhe
 Hangehange
 Harakeke
 Heketara
 Horoeka
 Horokaka
 Horopito
 Houhere
 Houpara
 Hutu
 Kahakaha
 Kahikatea
 Kaikōmako
 Kāmahi
 Kānuka
 Karaka
 Kareao
 Karo
 Kātote
 Kauri
 Kawakawa
 Kiekie
 Kohekohe
 Kōhia
 Kōhūhū
 Korokio tāranga
 Koromiko
 Kotukutuku
 Kōwhai
 Kūmara
 Kūmarahou
 Makomako
 Mamaku
 Mānuka
 Mataī
 Mingimingi
 Miro
 Monoao
 Neinei
 Nīkau
 Parataniwha
 Patē
 Pikopiko
 Pīngao
 Pōhutukawa
 Pōkākā
 Ponga
 Puka
 Rangiora (plant)
 Rātā
 Rimu
 Tarata
 Tauhinu
 Tawāpou
 Tāwhai
 Tītoki
 Toetoe
 Tōtara
 Tutu
 Wharariki
 Whekī
 Whekī ponga

+Maori
Māori words and phrases
Plants
Maori
Maori